Museum of Applied Arts  may refer to:

Leipzig Museum of Applied Arts, Germany
Museum of Applied Arts (Belgrade), Serbia
Museum of Applied Arts (Budapest), Hungary
Museum für angewandte Kunst Frankfurt, Germany
Museum für Angewandte Kunst (Cologne), Germany
Museum für angewandte Kunst Wien, Austria
Stieglitz Museum of Applied Arts (Saint Petersburg), Russia